Dudley Sports Centre was an outdoor sports centre located in Dudley, England. It was laid out at the end of the 19th century and expanded in 1928 on the construction of a football ground on the site; which became the home of the town's football team. There was also a cricket pitch, athletics field and public playing field.

Parts of the ground were affected by mining subsidence for much of the centre's existence. It was finally shut down on 25 May 1985 when a 40-foot wide hole appeared on the cricket pitch. All subsequent plans for sports to return to the centre had to be shelved due to ongoing problems with subsidence.

By the early 1990s, Dudley Sports Centre was heavily overgrown and the site was fenced off for safety reasons, though no demolition work had yet taken place. On at least one occasion, gypsies moved onto the site before the local authority forced them to move on.

Clearance of the site began in 1998, in preparation for the construction of the Castle Gate complex; which would operate as a business and leisure park. This project had been on the council's agenda for at least six years. In 2001, a McDonald's and Showcase cinema opened on the site, with Pizza Hut opening an outlet the following year. The site now also consists of a bowling alley, hotel and American restaurant (Frankie & Benny's) as well as several units for commercial use.

References
 Britain in Old Photographs (Hilary Atkins, Diane Matthews and Samantha Robins; 1998)

Sports venues in the West Midlands (county)
Sport in Dudley